Dimples  is a 1936 American musical drama film directed by William A. Seiter. The screenplay was written by Nat Perrin and Arthur Sheekman. The film is about a young mid-nineteenth century street entertainer (Shirley Temple) who is separated from her pickpocket grandfather (Frank Morgan) when given a home by a wealthy New York City widow (Helen Westley). The film was panned by the critics. Videocassette and DVD versions of the film were available in 2009.

Cast
 Shirley Temple as Sylvia Dolores "Dimples" Appleby, an 8-year-old girl who is a street performer in New York City circa 1850 and Professor Appleby's granddaughter
 Frank Morgan as Professor Eustace Appleby, a 46-year-old man who is a pickpocket and Dimples's grandfather
 Helen Westley as Mrs. Caroline Drew, Allen's aunt and Dimples's patroness
 Robert Kent as Allen Drew, a theatrical producer and Caroline Drew's nephew
 Astrid Allwyn as Cleo Marsh, a haughty actress and Allen's sudden romantic interest
 Delma Byron as Betty Loring, Allen's betrothed and the daughter of Colonel Loring
 Berton Churchill as Colonel Jasper Loring, Betty's father
 Julius Tannen as Emery T. Hawkins, a swindler
 John Carradine as Richards, a swindler
 Stepin Fetchit as Cicero, a servant
 Billy McClain as Rufus
 Jack Clifford as Uncle Tom, a character in Allen's new play
 Betty Jean Hainey as Topsy, a character in Allen's new play
 Paul Stanton as Mr. St. Clair, a character in Allen's new play
 The Hall Johnson Choir as Choir

Production

This movie was originally to be titled The Bowery Princess but was changed as it was deemed too coarse for Temple's image.

There was a great deal of friction on the set of this movie as Morgan and Temple repeatedly tried to steal scenes from one another. Morgan would place his stovepipe hat on a table blocking Temple's face and forcing her to move her marks and out of the camera lights. He would also keep moving his hands near her eye level by tinkering with a handkerchief or placing on gloves. Temple for her part would either yawn or scratch her face. In the scene where Morgan's character gets ripped off by con men, Temple jiggled the fishing pole she was holding in the background in an attempt to draw attention away from Morgan. She also worked with Robinson to devise ways of creating rhythmic pauses and gestures in her dance movements to prevent scene stealing from Morgan. Producer Nunally Johnson, commenting on the scene stealing, remarked that "When this picture is over, either Shirley will have acquired a taste for Scotch whiskey or Frank will come out with curls."

Music
The film's songs – "Hey, What Did the Blue Jay Say", "He Was a Dandy", "Picture Me Without You", "Get On Board", "Dixie-anna", and "Wings of the Morning" – were written by Jimmy McHugh and lyricist Ted Koehler. The dances were choreographed by Bill Robinson who appeared with Temple in four films and partnered her for the famous staircase tap dance in The Little Colonel.

Sony Computer Entertainment later used the song Get On Board for a PlayStation 2 advertisement entitled "Mountain".

Release

Critical reception
New York Times reviewer Frank Nugent considered Dimples a generic Shirley Temple production, with unsurprising plot elements, and was of the opinion that "'Dimples' is not the best Temple, nor the worst.'"

Temple scholar Robert Windeler notes that Temple was upstaged for the first time in one of her pictures.

Home media
The film was released on DVD on March 12, 2002. In 2009, a videocassette was available in the original black and white and in computer-colorized versions of the original.  Some editions included  theatrical trailers and other special features.

See also
 List of American films of 1936
 Shirley Temple filmography

References
Works cited
 
 

Web citations

External links 
 
 
 
 

1936 films
1936 musical films
American black-and-white films
Films directed by William A. Seiter
Films set in New York City
20th Century Fox films
American musical films
1930s American films